The Grumeti River is a river in Mara Region, Tanzania, situated almost entirely within the western corridor of Serengeti National Park. It flows westward and mouths into the Speke Gulf of Lake Victoria.

Great Migration Crossing 
It is a major river crossing for the Serengeti Great migration. During May to August, thousands of wildebeest and other animals cross the crocodile-infested waters. It is famed for this sight alongside Mara River.

References 

Rivers of Tanzania